Kirsikka Saari, (born in 1973) in Helsinki, is a Finnish film maker and screenwriter.

Saari and fellow producer Selma Vilhunen are nominated for an Academy Award for Best Live Action Short Film for the 2013 film Do I Have to Take Care of Everything?.

References

External links

 Kirsikka Saari in 375 humanists – 28 May 2015. Faculty of Arts, University of Helsinki.

1973 births
Writers from Helsinki
Finnish screenwriters
Living people
Finnish women screenwriters